This is a list of commercial banks in Chad

 Ecobank
 UBA Tchad
 Commercial Bank of Tchad
 Orabank Tchad
 Société Générale du Tchad
 Banque Commerciale du Chari (BCC)
 Banque Agricole Commerciale (BAC)
 Banque Sahélo-Saharienne pour l'Investissement et le Commerce
 Banque de l'Habitat du Tchad (BHT)
Attijari Bank Tchad

See also
 List of banks in Africa
 Central Bank of Central African States

References

External links
Website of Central Bank of Central African States

 
Banks
Chad
Chad